David John Courtney (born 17 February 1959) is an English self-proclaimed former gangster who has become both an author and celebrity.

Author Bernard O'Mahoney and Frankie Fraser (the former member of the Richardson gang) have accused Courtney of embellishing and fabricating his criminal record and position in the underworld; however, Courtney has denied overstating his past.

Personal life 
Courtney was born in Bermondsey, London. He went to Adamsrill primary school in  Sydenham South East London.

Courtney often focuses on his links with gangsters such as Reggie Kray and Lenny McLean, although he was nine years old when Kray was imprisoned. Courtney has claimed to have been shot, stabbed, had his nose bitten off, and stated that he has had to kill to stay alive. He makes the claim that his involvement in a car crash on the M20 was an attempt by "someone who had a grudge against him" to kill him.

He often refers to himself as Dave Courtney OBE, the suffix standing for One Big Ego. His house in Plumstead, called Camelot Castle, is decorated with union flags and the cross of St George, a painted depiction of himself as a knight and a large knuckle duster.

Courtney claims to have been involved in debt-collecting, minding clubs, assault, contraband, and murder. He also claims he has spent time in Belmarsh Prison as a high security prisoner, which has been backed up by ex-prison guard Jim Dawkins in his book The Loose Screw.

In his book F**k the Ride, Courtney claims to have been found not guilty in 19 separate trials. He has cultivated a reputation for using the knuckle duster when debt-collecting and was known as "The Yellow Pages of the Underworld".

Author 
Courtney is now an author, having had six books published: Stop The Ride I Want to Get Off, Raving Lunacy, Dodgy Dave's Little Black Book, The Ride's Back On, F**k the Ride, and Heroes & Villains.

He starred in and produced his own film, Hell To Pay, and took on the leading role of Mad Dave opposite Manish Patel in low-budget British film Triads, Yardies and Onion Bhajees. However, Courtney is probably best known for organising the security at gangster Ronnie Kray's funeral in 1995. Courtney has claimed to be the inspiration for Vinnie Jones's debt-collecting hard man in the movie Lock, Stock and Two Smoking Barrels, although no formal statement by Director Guy Ritchie has been made to support this.

Acting 
Largely making a living from television documentaries and personal appearances, Courtney ran his own website, was involved in charity work and worked on the films Six Bend Trap and Clubbing To Death alongside Craig Charles and Nick Moran. Courtney was featured in the 2008 film The Dead Sleep Easy, filmed on location in Mexico.

He has worked with Director Liam Galvin on 2 DVDs – Dave Courtney's Dodgy DVD and Dave Courtney Even Dodgier – both released by Gangster Videos. He collaborated again with Liam Galvin on the 2010 film Killer Bitch and the 2016 film Mob Handed. In his latest movie Full English Breakfast, Courtney stars in the lead role, playing the part of notorious gangster Dave Bishop.

He appeared in the film Mother's Child (2020), as club owner Mr Townsend alongside Alex Reid, Swaylee Loughnane, and Lee Westwick. It was released worldwide on Amazon Prime, DVD, and Blu Ray.

Legal cases 
In June 2004, Courtney was cleared of beating his girlfriend Jennifer Lucrea Pinto during a row over her lesbian lover.

In January 2009 he was given an 18-month conditional discharge at Bristol Crown Court, on a charge of possessing live ammunition without a firearms certificate. His defence of not knowing that the single live pistol round was live rather than a stage prop prompted Judge Ticehurst to comment, "It perhaps undermines your street credibility and your stage performance that you cannot distinguish between a real round and a fake round. But perhaps that's not for me to say."

In May 2009, Courtney filed for bankruptcy, reportedly owing £400,000 to creditors, including taxes of £250,000.

On 29 July 2009, he was arrested and charged with possession of a prohibited weapon, specifically a Brocock Air Cartridge pistol, and possession of a firearm whilst being a prohibited person. He was sent in custody to Woolwich Crown Court for trial. The Brocock pistol was previously legal as an air-weapon (and would then have been legal for Courtney to possess) but police concerns over the "ease" with which they can be converted into cartridge-firing firearms led to a ban on this specific design. Courtney was on remand in HMP Belmarsh, concerning the aforementioned firearms offences. On 10 December 2009, Courtney was cleared after the jury took two hours to find him not guilty on all charges.

In popular culture 

 Song made about him by punk rock band Rancid on the album Indestructible.
 He was featured on the UK science show Brainiac: Science Abuse where he was enlisted to attempt to break into an "unbreakable" safe. He did not succeed.

Publications

Filmography 
 Mob Handed (2016)...Tank Killer
Gangsters Gamblers Geezers (2016) ... Terry 
 Full English Breakfast (2014)
 Fraud (2011) ... Vice.com
 Killer Bitch (2010) ... Dave
 The Dead Sleep Easy (2008) ... Tlaloc
 Clubbing to Death (2007) ... Harry Dench
 Six Bend Trap (2006) ... Gordy Metcalf
 Hell to Pay (2005) ... Dave Malone
 The Baby Juice Express (2004) ... Baxter
 Triads, Yardies and Onion Bhajees (2003) ... Mad Dave
 Dave Courtney's Underworld (Documentary) (2000) ... Himself
 One in Something (1999) ... Judge
 The Krays (1990) ... Bill

References

External links 
 Official website
 

1959 births
Living people
People from Bermondsey
English non-fiction writers
English gangsters
English male non-fiction writers
Criminals from London